Royal Air Force Ashford or more simply RAF Ashford is a former Royal Air Force Advanced Landing Ground in Kent, England.

Opened in 1943, Ashford was one of several prototypes for the temporary Advanced Landing Ground airfields built in France after D-Day, required as the Allied forces moved east across France and Germany. It was used by British, Dominion and the United States Army Air Forces. It was closed in September 1944.

Today the airfield is a mixture of agricultural fields with few recognisable remains.

History

The following units were also here at some point:
 No. 129 Airfield RAF (August - October 1943)
 No. 3205 Servicing Commando
 No. 3206 Servicing Commando
 No. 3207 Servicing Commando
 No. 3209 Servicing Commando

United States Army Air Forces use

Ashford was known as USAAF Station AAF-417 for security reasons by the USAAF during the war, and by which it was referred to instead of location.  Its USAAF Station Code was "AF".

406th Fighter Group

On 5 April the airmen of the 406th Fighter Group arrived, having crossed the Atlantic by troopship. The group arrived from Congaree Army Airfield South Carolina.  Operational fighter squadrons and fuselage codes were:

 512th Fighter Squadron (L3) (yellow)
 513th Fighter Squadron (4P) (red)
 514th Fighter Squadron (O7) (blue)

The 406th Fighter Group was part of the 303d Fighter Wing, XIX Tactical Air Command.

The 406th Fighter Group conducted its first operation on 9 May and was chiefly involved in fighter-bomber work. On 18 when the 513th started to use ALG A-13 at Tour-en-Bessin. The last remnants of the 406th departed RAF Ashford on 31 July.

Bombing

The airfield was bombed during a night-time raid on 22 May 1944, at 12:35 am. These were RAF Volunteer Reservists of 5003 Airfield Construction Squadron, based at RAF Great Chart, some 1.2 km northeast of the airfield. There were 30 casualties, 14 being fatal.

Current use
With the facility released from military control, Ashford was rapidly returned to agricultural use. There is little to indicate that an airfield ever existed at this location.

See also

List of former Royal Air Force stations

References

Citations

Bibliography
 The Military Airfields of Britain, pp 30–31, Ken Delve, 2005, Crowood, 

 Freeman, Roger A. (1994) UK Airfields of the Ninth: Then and Now, 1994. After the Battle 
 Freeman, Roger A. (1996) The Ninth Air Force in Colour: UK and the Continent-World War Two. After the Battle 

 Maurer, Maurer (1983). Air Force Combat Units of World War II. Maxwell AFB, Alabama: Office of Air Force History. .

 USAAS-USAAC-USAAF-USAF Aircraft Serial Numbers--1908 to present
 British Automobile Association (AA), (1978), Complete Atlas of Britain, 

Royal Air Force stations in Kent
Royal Air Force stations of World War II in the United Kingdom
RAF